In Māori tradition, Hatupatu (or "Hatu Patu") was the youngest of four sons of the Te Arawa iwi, and became a chief. When he was growing up he was bullied by his elder brothers. Legend tells of his wily escape from the bird-woman Kurangaituku, by hiding inside a rock and then leading her into a boiling mud pool. Having grown into a man of ability and confidence, he led his people in battle against their enemy, chief Raumati, who had burned the Te Arawa canoe. Killing this powerful enemy, he gained great respect and mana, and set himself on the path to becoming one of the most famous of all Māori warriors. The parents of Hatupatu were Tamateahirau and Okarikiroa.

In popular culture 
A book by New Zealand author Whiti Hereaka about this legend from the from the point of view of the bird-women called Kurangaituku (Huia Publishers 2021) won the top prize for fiction at the 2022 Ockham New Zealand Book Awards.

The legend was the subject of a song by the same name performed by metal band Alien Weaponry in their 2021 album Tangaroa.

References

Legendary Māori people